ATP synthase delta/epsilon subunit is a part of the ATP synthase and the F-ATPase family in general. It is known as the delta subunit in mitochondrial ATP syntheses, and the epsilon subunit in bacterial and chloroplastic ATP syntheses. It is part of the rotor between subunits F1 and FO. Its C terminal domain seems to inhibit ATPase activity of the synthase.

References 

Enzymes